A ship sponsor, by tradition, is a female civilian who is invited to "sponsor" a vessel, presumably to bestow good luck and divine protection over the seagoing vessel and all that sail aboard. In the United States Navy and the United States Coast Guard the sponsor is technically considered a permanent member of the ship's crew and is expected to give a part of her personality to the ship, as well as advocate for its continued service and well-being. For passenger ships the sponsor is called a godmother if the sponsor is female, or a godfather if the sponsor is male.

Passenger ship godparents

Carnival Cruise Lines
Carnival Breeze – Tracey Wilson Mourning
Carnival Conquest – Lindy Boggs
Carnival Dream – Marcia Gay Harden
Carnival Ecstasy – Kathy Lee Gifford
Carnival Elation – Shari Arison
Carnival Fantasy – Tellervo Koivisto  
Carnival Fascination – Jeanne Farcus
Carnival Freedom – Kathy Ireland
Carnival Glory – Dr. Sally Ride
Carnival Horizon – Queen Latifah
Carnival Imagination – Jodi Dickinson
Carnival Inspiration – Mary Ann Shula
Carnival Legend – Judi Dench
Carnival Liberty – Mira Sorvino
Carnival Magic – Lindsay Wilkerson
Carnival Miracle – Jessica Lynch
Carnival Panorama – Vanna White
Carnival Paradise – Paula Zahn
Carnival Pride – Tamara Jernigan
Carnival Sensation – Vicki L. Freed, Roberta Jacoby, Cherie Weinstein, Geri Donnelly 
Carnival Splendor – Myleene Klass
Carnival Spirit – Elizabeth Dole
Carnival Sunrise – Kelly Arison
Carnival Sunshine – Lin Arison
Carnival Valor – Katie Couric
Carnival Vista – Kye Heald, first Godchild for Carnival
Carnival Victory – Mary Frank

Disney Cruise Line
Disney Magic – Patricia Disney
Disney Wonder – Tinkerbell
Disney Dream – Jennifer Hudson
Disney Fantasy – Mariah Carey

Holland America Line
MS Nieuw Amsterdam – Queen Máxima of the Netherlands
MS Volendam – Chris Evert
MS Zaandam – Mary-Kate and Ashley Olsen
MS Nieuw Statendam - Oprah Winfrey

Norwegian Cruise Line
Norwegian Bliss – Elvis Duran
Norwegian Breakaway – The Rockettes
Norwegian Dawn – Kim Cattrall
Norwegian Encore - Kelly Clarkson
Norwegian Epic – Reba McEntire
Norwegian Escape – Pitbull
Norwegian Gem – Cindy Cardella
Norwegian Getaway – Miami Dolphins Cheerleaders
Norwegian Jewel – Melania Trump
Norwegian Pearl – Rosie O'Donnell
Norwegian Star – Brooke Burke
Norwegian Sun – Angela Baraquio
Pride of Aloha – Margaret Awamura Inouye
Pride of America – Elaine L. Chao

Princess Cruises
Caribbean Princess – Jill Whelan
Coral Princess – Mireya Moscoso
Crown Princess – Martha Stewart
Diamond Princess – Yoshiko Tsukuda
Emerald Princess – Florence Henderson, Susan Olsen, Marion Ross and Erin Moran
Island Princess – Jamie Sale and David Pelletier
Regal Princess – Gavin MacLeod, Fred Grandy, Ted Lange, Bernie Kopell, Lauren Tewes and Jill Whelan
Royal Princess – Catherine, Duchess of Cambridge
Ruby Princess – Trista Sutter and Ryan Sutter

Royal Caribbean International
MV Adventure of the Seas – Tara Stackpole (FDNY), Kevin Hannafin (FDNY), Margaret McDonnell (NYPD), Sgt. Richard Lucas (NYPD); chosen in honor of the numerous casualties suffered by the FDNY and the NYPD in the September 11 attacks
MV Allure of the Seas – Princess Fiona
MV Anthem of the Seas – Emma Wilby 
MV Brilliance of the Seas – Marilyn Ofer
MV Empress of the Seas – Gloria Estefan
MV Enchantment of the Seas – Colleen Fain, wife of Richard Fain
MV Explorer of the Seas – Jackie Joyner-Kersee
MV Freedom of the Seas – Katherine Louise Calder
MV Grandeur of the Seas – Aviva Ofer, wife of Sammy Ofer and mother of Eyal Ofer, a member of Royal Caribbean's Board of Directors
MV Independence of the Seas – Elizabeth Hill
MV Harmony of the Seas – Brittany Affolter
MV Jewel of the Seas – Kathy Mellor, 2004 US National Teacher of the Year
MV Legend of the Seas – Cindy Pritzker, wife of Jay Pritzker
MV Liberty of the Seas – Donnalea Madeley
MV Majesty of the Seas – Queen Sonja of Norway
MV Mariner of the Seas – Jean Driscoll
MV Monarch of the Seas – Lauren Bacall
MV Navigator of the Seas – Steffi Graf
MV Oasis of the Seas – Gloria Estefan, Michelle Kwan, Jane Seymour, Dara Torres, Keshia Knight Pulliam, Shawn Johnson, Daisy Fuentes
MV Ovation of the Seas – Fan Bingbing
MV Quantum of the Seas – Kristin Chenoweth
MV Radiance of the Seas – Margot L. Pritzker, wife of Royal Caribbean board member Thomas J. Pritzker
MV Rhapsody of the Seas – Bodil Wilhelmsen, wife of Royal Caribbean principal shareholder Gjert Wilhelmsen
MV Serenade of the Seas – Whoopi Goldberg
MV Sovereign of the Seas- Former First Lady Rosalynn Carter
MV Splendour of the Seas – Lise Wilhelmsen, wife of Board member Arne Wilhelmsen
MV Symphony of the Seas – Carlos and Alexa PenaVega
MV Vision of the Seas – Helen Morin Stephan (wife of Royal Caribbean's founder and Vice Chairman Edwin Stephan)
MV Voyager of the Seas – Katarina Witt

Celebrity Cruises
Celebrity Apex - Reshma Saujani, founder and CEO of international non-profit Girls Who Code
Celebrity Eclipse - Emma Pontin
Celebrity Edge - Malala Yousafzai, Nobel Laureate
Celebrity Equinox - Nina Barough, founder of UK-based cancer charity
Celebrity Flora - Yolanda Kakabadse
Celebrity Reflection - Jovanka Goronjic, Megan Mathie, Helen O'Connell, and Rosey Rodriguez, Four employees who support breast cancer causes
Celebrity Silhouette - Michelle Morgan
Celebrity Solstice – Professor Sharon L. Smith

See also
 Ceremonial ship launching (christening)

References

2. Carnival Cruise Lines News." Carnival Cruise Lines News Ship Fact Sheets Category. N.p., 2012. Web. 26 Apr. 2013.
3. "Royal Princess (2013)." Wikipedia. Wikimedia Foundation, 21 Apr. 2013. Web. 29 Apr. 2013.
4. "Godmothers of Princess Ships." Www.princess.com. N.p., n.d. Web. 29 Apr. 2013.
5. Princess Cruises Ship Christeners : Princess Cruises." Www.princess.com. N.p., n.d. Web. 29 Apr. 2013.

Maritime transport
Superstitions